Hideyuki (written: , , , , , ,  or ) is a masculine Japanese given name. Notable people with the name include:

, Japanese footballer
Hideyuki Akaza (赤座 英之), Japanese urologist
, Japanese engineer and physicist
, Japanese karateka
, Japanese ice hockey player
Hideyuki Busujima (born 1952/1953), Japanese billionaire businessman
, Japanese drifting driver
, Japanese Go player
, Japanese composer
, Japanese daimyō
, Japanese film director
, Japanese voice actor
, Japanese footballer
, Japanese footballer
, Japanese writer
, Japanese writer and screenwriter
, Japanese sport wrestler
, Japanese footballer
, Japanese footballer
, Japanese boxer
, Japanese ice hockey player
, Japanese volleyball player
, Japanese Go player
, Japanese shogi player
, Japanese pole vaulter
, Japanese voice actor
, Japanese footballer
, Japanese voice actor
, Japanese manga artist

Japanese masculine given names